Major General David Mark Cullen,  is a senior British Army officer. He served as the Assistant Chief of the General Staff from 2013 to 2015.

Military career
After being educated at the Duke of York's Royal Military School and the Royal Military Academy Sandhurst, Cullen was commissioned into the Royal Artillery in 1982. He served as commanding officer of the 1st Regiment Royal Horse Artillery during deployment to Basra in Iraq in 2004, for which he was appointed an Officer of the Order of the British Empire. He was made Commander of the 12th Mechanized Brigade in November 2007, in which role he saw service in Afghanistan, Director of Army Staff in December 2009, and Chief of Staff for Land Forces in October 2011. He went on to became Deputy Commanding General-Support, III Corps and Fort Hood in October 2012 and served as Assistant Chief of the General Staff from January 2013 to December 2015. Cullen retired from the British Army on 11 May 2016.

References

People educated at the Duke of York's Royal Military School
Graduates of the Royal Military Academy Sandhurst
British Army major generals
British Army personnel of the Iraq War
British Army personnel of the War in Afghanistan (2001–2021)
Companions of the Order of the Bath
Living people
Officers of the Order of the British Empire
Royal Artillery officers
Year of birth missing (living people)